100 Bushels of Rye is a 1988 role-playing game adventure for HârnMaster published by Columbia Games.

Plot summary
100 Bushels of Rye is a scenario set in Kaldor in which the heroes are sent to investigate two linked mysteries: a series of murders at an iron mine and why the village of Loban has failed to pay its  annual feudal obligation of 100 bushels of rye. The book details Loban and the mine complex.

Publication history
100 Bushels of Rye was written by Garry Hamlin and Randolph L. Strommen, with art by Eric Hotz, and was published by Columbia Games in 1988 as a 32-page book.

When Columbia Games began to shift its focus toward supporting their new Hârnmaster RPG, the first ever Hârn adventures appeared, 100 Bushels of Rye (1988) and The Staff of Fanon (1988), as well as the rules-oriented Pilots' Almanac (1988), followed by a series of magic books and other RPG supplements.

Reception
In the October 1989 edition of Dragon (Issue 150), Ken Rolston was impressed by this module, calling it "a perfect short adventure in a series of brief episodes, featuring a simple narrative focus, plenty of detail for each episode, challenging problem-solving (only a fraction of which involves combat), and the appealing narrative virtues of mystery, surprise, and discovery." He thought the visual presentation was "well presented, and uses a page layout ideal for quick reference during the session." He was equally as impressed with the settings, calling them "authentically medieval." Rolston concluded with a thumbs up, saying "As an example of a medieval manorial village for fantasy role-playing, and as an example of a simple, well-designed, short FRP scenario, 100 Bushels of Rye is highly recommended."

References

Fantasy role-playing game adventures
Hârn
Role-playing game supplements introduced in 1988